Wau may refer to:

Places and jurisdictions

Papua New Guinea 
 Wau, Papua New Guinea
 Wau Airport (Papua New Guinea)
 Wau Rural LLG, (local level government)

South Sudan 
 Wau State
 Wau, South Sudan City
 Wau railway station
 Wau football stadium
 Wau River
 The Roman Catholic Diocese of Wau

People 
 Nuelson Wau (born 1980), Dutch Antillean footballer
 Nyron Wau (born 1982), Dutch footballer

Other 
 WAU Animation, an animation studio in Malaysia
 Battle of Wau, a battle during World War II
 Wau Ecology Institute, an environment organisation in Papua New Guinea
 Wau (letter) or digamma, an obsolete Greek alphabet letter
 WAU! Mr. Modo Recordings, a record label
 Wau Holland Foundation, a non-profit organisation in Germany
 Wau, a fictional alien race in the media franchise Tenchi Muyo!
 Wau bulan, a traditional kite in Malaysia

As an abbreviation 
As an abbreviation, WAU or W.A.U. may refer to:
 Walk Among Us, a 1982 album by the American punk rock band Misfits
 Walkinshaw Andretti United, Australian motor racing team
 Warden Unit, a fictional AI system appearing in the video game Soma
 Washington Adventist University, a private Seventh-day Adventist university
 Weekly active users, a performance metric for the success of an internet product
 Windows Anytime Upgrade, an upgrade method offered by Microsoft Corporation

See also 
 WAW (disambiguation)